Kubanychbek Mırzabekoviç Jumaliyev (Кубанычбек Мырзабекович Жумалиев) (born 26 April 1956) served as the Prime Minister of Kyrgyzstan from 24 March 1998 to 23 December 1998.

He was born in Jalal-Abad Province. He graduated from Ryazan Radiotechnical Institute in 1978 and worked in Frunze Polytechnic Institute from 1978 to 1992. He has a doctorate in Physical and Technical Sciences, and his scientific research was in holography and optical information processing.

He served as the First Deputy Minister of Education and Science from 1994 to 1995, the First Deputy State Secretary from 1995 to 1996, the Chief of Staff from 1996 to 1998, Prime Minister from 24 March 1998 to 23 December 1998, Governor of Jalal-Abad Province from 1998 to 2001, Minister of Transport and Communications from 2001 to 2005, and First Vice Prime Minister from 2002–2005. He founded the Democratic Party Adilet party.

He is married with four children.

References

1956 births
Living people
People from Jalal-Abad Region
Prime Ministers of Kyrgyzstan
Democratic Party Adilet politicians